Hellinsia conscius is a moth of the family Pterophoridae that is known from Kenya.

References

conscius
Moths described in 1920
Endemic moths of Kenya
Moths of Africa